Albany Park is the name of various geographic locations:

Albany Park, Bexley, an area and park in the London Borough of Bexley
Albany Park, Enfield, a park in the London Borough of Enfield
Albany Park, Chicago, a community area of Chicago